Yumei is a female given name of Chinese origin. It may refer to:

 Chen Yu-mei (1966–2017), Republic of China politician
 Chen Yumei (1910–1985), Chinese film actress and singer, fl. 1920s-1930s
 Ding / Hui / Xu Yumei, Hui Ka Yan (1958) 's wife
 Liu Yumei (born 1961), Chinese former handball player
 Tian Yumei (born 1965), Chinese former sprint athlete
 Wang Yumei (born 1934), Chinese film actress

Chinese feminine given names